Wayne Alexander may refer to:

Wayne Alexander (actor), American actor
Wayne Alexander (boxer) (born 1973), British boxer